Jillson is a surname. Notable people with the surname include:

Jeff Jillson (born 1980), American ice hockey player
Joyce Jillson (1945–2004), American columnist, writer, actress and astrologist
Justus K. Jillson, American educator and politician
Willard Rouse Jillson (1890–1975), American historian, academic and geologist